George Edward Arcaro (February 19, 1916 – November 14, 1997),  was an American Thoroughbred horse racing Hall of Fame jockey who won more American classic races than any other jockey in history and is the only rider to have won the U.S. Triple Crown twice. He is widely regarded as one of the greatest jockeys in the history of American Thoroughbred horse racing. Arcaro was born in Cincinnati, Ohio, the son of an impoverished taxi driver. His parents, Pasquale and Josephine, were Italian immigrants and his father held a number of jobs, including taxi driver and operator of an illegal liquor enterprise during Prohibition. Arcaro was born prematurely, and weighed just three pounds at birth; because of this, he was smaller than his classmates and was rejected when he tried out for a spot on a baseball team. His full height would reach just five-foot, two inches. Eventually nicknamed "Banana Nose" by his confreres, Arcaro won his first race in 1932 at the Agua Caliente racetrack in Tijuana, Mexico; he was 16 years old.  In 1934, the inaugural year of Narragansett Park, Arcaro was a comparative unknown who rode many of his early career races at 'Gansett.

American classic races
Arcaro won his first Kentucky Derby in 1938 aboard Lawrin. He is tied with Bill Hartack for most Derby wins with five, and has the most wins in the Preakness and the Belmont Stakes with six. He won the U.S. Triple Crown in 1941 on Whirlaway and again in 1948 on Citation. His other Kentucky Derby wins were Hoop Jr. (1945) and Hill Gail (1952).

Major stakes wins
Arcaro also won the Suburban Handicap eight times, the Wood Memorial Stakes nine times and the Jockey Club Gold Cup ten times.

In international competition, at old Woodbine Racetrack in Toronto, Arcaro won the 1953 Queen's Plate (Canada's most prestigious race); at Laurel Park Racecourse in Laurel, Maryland, he won the 1954 Washington, D.C. International against the best horses and riders from Europe.

In 1953 Arcaro was voted the George Woolf Memorial Jockey Award, and in 1958 he was inducted into the National Museum of Racing and Hall of Fame in Saratoga Springs, New York.

Active in jockey affairs, Arcaro was a driving force behind the creation of the Jockeys' Guild. He retired in 1962, due to severe bursitis in his arm. During his career Arcaro rode in 24,092 races and won 4,779, with record setting earnings of $30,039,543. After working as a television commentator on racing for CBS and ABC, he was a public relations officer for the Golden Nugget Casino in Las Vegas before retiring to Miami, Florida. He also worked as a spokesman for the Buick Motor Division of General Motors, for which he voiced the well-known phrase "If you price a Buick, you'll buy a Buick." For many years, he was the proprietor of a popular Italian restaurant in Beverly Hills.

Arcaro died in 1997. His body was cremated and his ashes were interred in the columbarium at Our Lady of Mercy Catholic Cemetery in Miami. Today, he remains one of the best-known jockeys in the history of horse racing, called "the Master" for his riding skills, good sense of pace and the ability to switch his whip from one hand to the other with ease during a race.

Triple Crown race record 

† - Won the Triple Crown

‡ - Filly

Kentucky Derby: 21-5-3-2

Preakness: 15-6-2-4

Belmont: 21-6-3-2

References

External links
 An oral history with Eddie Arcaro at the Louie B. Nunn Center for Oral History at the University of Kentucky Libraries
 New York Times About, Inc. article/photographic collection titled Eddie Arcaro Remembered
 "Man on a Horse". Time. May 17, 1948.
 Eddie Arcaro interviewed by Mike Wallace on The Mike Wallace Interview on September 8, 1957
 Eddie Arcaro in the Belmont Stakes

1916 births
1997 deaths
American jockeys
American Champion jockeys
United States Thoroughbred Racing Hall of Fame inductees
Sportspeople from Cincinnati
American horse racing announcers
American sports announcers
People from Garden City, New York